Ferenc Barnás is a Hungarian novelist.

Biography 

Ferenc Barnás was born in 1959 in Debrecen, Hungary. From 1982 until 1988 he attended universities in Debrecen, Budapest, and Munich, graduated from Eötvös Loránd University (ELTE) in 1988 with MA degrees in Hungarian language and literature and Aesthetics. In 1991 he earned his doctoral degree at ELTE with a dissertation titled Hermann Hesse világképe (The World View of Hermann Hesse). From 1988 until 1994, he taught literature, philosophy and aesthetics in secondary schools for the arts in Budapest. From 1990 until 1992 he worked as an instructor of music aesthetics at the Department of Cultural History, ELTE. From 2000 until 2015 he worked as a museum attendant. He made a living as freelance writer from 1994 until 2000, and from 2015 until now.

Works

Novels 

 Az élősködő (The Parasite)
 Bagatell (Bagatelle)
 A kilencedik (The Ninth)
 Másik halál (Another Death)
 Életünk végéig 

His works have been translated into English, French, German, Czech, Croatian, Serb, Indonesian.

Awards 

 2019: Milán Füst Prize
 2013: AEGON Prize
 2006: Tibor Déry Prize
 2001: Sándor Márai Prize

External links 

 Ferenc Barnás' homepage at ferencbarnas.hu
 HUNLIT Hungarian Literature Online 

1959 births
Living people
Hungarian male novelists
20th-century Hungarian novelists
20th-century Hungarian male writers
21st-century Hungarian novelists
21st-century Hungarian male writers